Lee Chae-kyung ( born on 22 January 1975) is a South Korean actress. She made her acting debut in 1998 in theater, since then, she has appeared in number of plays, films and television series. She got recognition for her supporting roles in Hotel del Luna, The Crowned Clown (2019), Love Scene Number, Jirisan and Moonshine (2021). She has acted in films such as: Overman (2015) and #ALIVE (2020) among others.

Career
Lee Chae-kyung has exclusive contract with artist management company YK Media Plus since August 2021.

She was active as a musical actor in the Seoul Arts Troupe (2000-2007). In 2016, she appeared in TV series Love in the Moonlight, Guardian: The Lonely and Great God and Dr. Romantic.

Personal life and education
Lee Chae-kyung was Born in Sinjeong-dong, Nam-gu, Ulsan. She graduated from JoongAng Girls' Middle and High School, University of Ulsan, and then graduate in Performing Arts from Dankook University's graduate school.

Filmography

Films

Television series

Theater

Awards and nominations

References

External links
 
 
 
 Lee Chae-kyung on Daum 
 Lee Chae-kyung on Play DB

21st-century South Korean actresses
South Korean film actresses
South Korean television actresses
South Korean stage actresses
Living people
1975 births
Dankook University alumni
People from Ulsan